Yaoji, also known as Yunhua, is a Chinese goddess. She is the mother of Erlang Shen and younger sister of the Jade Emperor. A shaman and master herbalist, Yaoji is responsible for the presence of many medicinal herbs on Earth. She is a protective weather goddess who raises and soothes storms.

Some sources say that she was a daughter of the Yan Emperor, while later ones incorporate her into the Daoist religion by making her a daughter of the Queen Mother of the West. Yaoji is most well known from two poems, "The Ode of Gaotang" and "The Ode of the Divine Maiden", both of which are attributed to the late Warring States poet Song Yu.

Legends
There are several different myths about her original purpose and intent, yet it is generally accepted that she represents Goddess Peak (Shennu Feng) of Wu Mountain, the east gate to the Three Gorges on the Yangtze River. Yaoji once lived in the Heaven Palace, but she was bored. So one day she descended to Earth with her entourage of Fairies. They tamed and dredged the gorge and formed the mountains. By the time their work was complete, Yaoji discovered that she loved the Wushan Peaks. She decided to move in permanently along with her Fairy entourage. Eventually she transformed into one of the peaks, Goddess Mountain. The other peaks may be transformed Fairies or dragons.

Daughter of Yan Emperor
Yaoji first appeared in the Classic of Mountains and Seas. It states: "It is two hundred miles east of the country, and it is called the Guyao Mountain. The emperor's death, and her name was called the female corpse, which turned into Yao Grass. Its leaves are Xucheng, its flowers are yellow, in fact, like Tuqiu, the service is charming to others". In this account, Yaoji is the third daughter of Yan Emperor (Chidi) and the sister of Jingwei. Unfortunately, she dies at the age of marriage. Her body is buried on Wushan Mountain, and her soul flies to Guyao Mountain where it turns into Yao Grass. Later, the King of Heaven has pity and saves her from becoming a lonely ghost by arranging her on Wushan Mountain. In this way she finally becomes a goddess. Her maids also turn, one after another, into the famous twelve peaks of Wushan.

Daughter of the Queen Mother of the West
The legend of Yaoji helping Yu the Great to control flooding has long been circulated as a folktale. Later, in the late Tang dynasty and the Five Dynasties, Taoist Du Guangting used this legend to create Yunhua, the daughter of the Queen Mother of the West. His "Yongcheng Jixianlu" completely changed Yaoji's identity: "Yaoji was said to be the youngest daughter of the Queen Mother's 23 daughters, and the name was Yunhua".

She learned divine magic from the Goddess of Three Primes and was conferred the title Lady Yunhua, whose job was to guide the fairy boys and girls. She could not endure the quiet life in the heavenly palace. So one day she left the heavenly palace with a retinue to tour the East Sea. When she came to the mist-enveloped Wushan Mountains, she saw dragons causing trouble to the people. She was angry and decided to eliminate the evil dragon for the people. She killed the dragons and the bodies of the dragons turned into huge mountains blocking the flow of the Yangtze. The fields and towns were flooded. The area of today's Sichuan had become a boundless sea.

To control the floodwater, Yu came to the Yangtze River from the Yellow River. He tried to open up the Mountains to lead the water away. But it was such a momentous job that no human being could carry it out. Yaoji called over her six followers, who with their divine magic opened up a passage through the Three Gorges so that the floodwater could flow to the East Sea.

When Yu learned that it was Yaoji who helped him, he climbed to the top of the Wushan Mountains to express his gratitude to her. Yaoji suddenly appeared before his eyes and gave him a book on controlling water bound in yellow brocade.

Sister of the Jade Emperor 
According to an ancient text, during the Tang dynasty, the Taoist Shangqing sect used the Wushan goddess Yaoji, who could control water, instead of the Seven Fairies, and changed Yaoji from the daughter of the Yan Emperor to the sister of the Jade Emperor. In this version, Yaoji's sacrifice earns her the title Yunhua. Yunhua is one of the three-flower gathering goddesses or the goddess of the desire realm in Heaven, charged with the duty of limiting Gods' mortal desires such as love/affection, greed and ambition.

While she pursued an evil Dragon who had escaped from his chains in the heavenly prison, she fell in love with a mortal scholar, Yang Tianyou, who was willing to use his own heart to save her after hers was damaged by the Dragon. They married and had three children Yang Jiao, Yang Jian (Erlang Shen) and Yang Chan.

When the Jade Emperor discovered her marriage, he sent his the heavenly armies to kill the half bloods, the mortal man, and her. Only Yang Jian and his sister Yang Chan survived. She has been imprisoned under Mount Tao as punishment. Many years later, her son Yang Jian cleaves Mount Tao using his axe, hoping to set his mother free. He does successfully rescue his mother after he chases away the sun by carrying a mountain on his back.

In literature and poetry
Du Fu, the great poet of the Tang dynasty, lamented in his poems that "the Wushan goddess is wonderful and beautiful".
During the Warring States period, the poet Song Yu's "Gaotang fu" (高唐赋) and "Shennu fu" (神女赋) describe the Wushan goddess as "the beautiful fairy who did as the drifting clouds at dawn and showers of rain at evening". Therefore, the name "Wushan goddess" was often used as a metaphor for beautiful women.
Tang dynasty poet Li Bai wrote in his poem "Eight Poems of Ganxing" that "Tiandi's daughter Yaoji, wonderfully transformed into a cloud; turned into a night dream, unintentionally to King Chu". The story is set during the Warring States period and recounts a journey of King Huai to Gaotang, where he sees the beautiful goddess Yaoji in a dream. He is shocked by her beauty and becomes obsessed with her, ignoring political affairs.

Worship
At the foot of Flying Phoenix Peak of Wushan Mountains, there is a major temple dedicated to her memory, the Fairy Temple (神女廟).

In Daoist belief she was therefore bestowed the title of "Miaoyong Zhenren" (妙用真人, Perfect Person of the Miraculous Practice). The title of the temple is Ningzhen. The landscape around the temple is famous for its spectacular appearance and the beautiful clouds mysteriously covering the slopes of the mountains.

References

Chinese deities
Chinese goddesses